Ma Ka Pa Anand is an Indian actor and television presenter who has been working with Star Vijay. He has hosted Super Singer, Athu Ithu Ethu, Kings of Dance, KPY Champions, Mrs. Chinnathirai, The Wall, Cinema Kaaram Coffee, Start Music and Oo Solriya Oo Oohm Solriya. Anand previously worked as a video jockey for six years with Radio Mirchi in Dubai. He started his acting career with the film Vanavarayan Vallavarayan in 2014.

Career 
Ma Ka Pa worked as an RJ before hosting the show Cinema Kaaram Coffee. He later worked as a host for Super Singer and for Athu Ithu Ethu after Sivakarthikeyan left. While working as an RJ for Radio Mirchi in Chennai, he met Hiphop Tamizha, who sang "Club le Mabbu le". He worked as the host for many award functions on Vijay TV including the Vijay Television Awards and Mirchi Music Awards South. He was later cast as one of the leads in the rural-based film  Vanavarayan Vallavarayan (2014). He went on to play the lead in several films including Panjumittai (2016).

Television 

 Adhu Idhu Edhu
 Cinema Kaaram Coffee (Star Vijay)
 Super Singer Junior(season 3-present)
 Super Singer (Tamil reality show)(2011-present)
 Super Singer T20
 Kings of Dance (season 2)
 Mrs. Chinnathirai
 Mr and Mrs Chinnathirai (1-4)
The Wall (Tamil game show)
 Murattu Singles
Ramar Veedu
 Start Music Season 3
Bigg Boss (Tamil season 5) as Guest and to Support Priyanka Deshpande
Sound Party 2.0
 Kalakka Povathu Yaaru? Champions (2017-2020)
Anda Ka Kasam (2022)
Oo Solriya Oo Oohm Solriya (2022)
Super Singer 9 (2022)

Filmography

Discography

Playback singer

References

 Ma Ka Pa finds commentary a challenge
 Ma Ka Pa Anand thanks his fans

External links
 

Indian television presenters
Living people
Indian radio presenters
Indian stand-up comedians
Male actors from Chennai
Year of birth missing (living people)